Nico Bastian (born 15 April 1990 in Heidelberg) is a racing driver from Germany. He currently competes in the Blancpain GT Series Endurance Cup for Mercedes-Benz.

Career results

References

External links
Official website (in German)
Profile at Driver Database

German racing drivers
Sportspeople from Heidelberg
1990 births
Living people
24H Series drivers
Nürburgring 24 Hours drivers
Blancpain Endurance Series drivers
Rowe Racing drivers
ADAC GT Masters drivers
Mercedes-AMG Motorsport drivers
Fortec Motorsport drivers
Michelin Pilot Challenge drivers
21st-century German people